The 70th Infantry Division (70-ya Pekhotnaya Diviziya) was a reserve infantry formation of the Russian Imperial Army.It was mobilized twice, in 1904–1905 for the Russo-Japanese War and in 1914–1918 for World War I.

Organization
1st Brigade
277th Infantry Regiment
278th Infantry Regiment
2nd Brigade
279th Infantry Regiment
280th Infantry Regiment

References

Infantry divisions of the Russian Empire
Military units and formations established in 1904
Military units and formations disestablished in 1905
Military units and formations established in 1914
Military units and formations disestablished in 1918